Ojetta Rogeriee Thompson (born August 8, 1951), known commonly as O. Rogeriee Thompson, is an American lawyer who serves as a Senior United States circuit judge of the United States Court of Appeals for the First Circuit and a former Rhode Island Superior Court justice.

Early life and education 
Thompson was born in segregated Anderson, South Carolina, and grew up in Greenville, South Carolina. She attended Scarsdale High School in Scarsdale, New York, under the auspices of the Student Transfer and Exchange Program (STEP), graduating in 1969. She came to Rhode Island to attend Pembroke College, which was the coordinate women's college for Brown University. Thompson earned an Artium Baccalaureus degree from Brown University in 1973 and a Juris Doctor from the Boston University School of Law in 1976.

Professional career 
Thompson began her career working as a cashier at the Providence Civic Center in 1973. In 1975 she worked as a law clerk for the Harvard Legal Aid Bureau. In 1974 Thompson started out as a legal intern for Rhode Island Legal Services and then returned in 1976 as Senior Staff Attorney and Family Law Manager until 1979. From 1979 to 1980 she was an Associate for the law firm of McKinnon and Fortunato. In 1980, Thompson became the Assistant City Solicitor for Providence, Rhode Island, and held this position until 1982. Also in 1980, Thompson was a solo practitioner until 1984 when she opened a law firm in South Providence while raising a family with her husband, Rhode Island District Court judge William Clifton. In 1988, Thompson was appointed to the Rhode Island District Court by Governor Edward D. DiPrete. In 1997, she was elevated to the Rhode Island Superior Court by Governor Lincoln Almond.

Federal judicial career 
On April 13, 2009, United States Senators Jack Reed and Sheldon Whitehouse announced that they were recommending that President Obama nominate Thompson to the United States Court of Appeals for the First Circuit, to fill the seat left vacant by First Circuit Judge Bruce M. Selya's transition to senior status at the end of 2006. On October 6, 2009, Obama formally nominated Thompson to the seat on the First Circuit. She was confirmed by the Senate on March 17, 2010 by a 98–0 vote. She received her commission on March 30, 2010. She assumed senior status on September 21, 2022.

In August 2017, Thompson dissented when the en banc circuit rejected a lawsuit seeking to give Puerto Ricans the right to vote in U.S. federal elections.
In July 2020 Thompson was part of an appellate court decision that vacated the death sentence and overturned three of the firearm convictions of Boston Marathon bomber Dzhokhar Tsarnaev, and referred the matter back to the lower courts. The appellate court cited errors in the sentencing proceedings that found Dzhokhar guilty and condemned him to death; however, the appellate court upheld the life sentence for Dzhokhar.
 Tsarnaev's death sentence was reinstated by the Supreme Court on March 4, 2022.

Personal 
Thompson lives in Cranston, Rhode Island. She has three children.

See also 
 List of African-American federal judges
 List of African-American jurists
 List of first women lawyers and judges in Rhode Island

References

External links 

1951 births
Living people
20th-century American lawyers
20th-century American women lawyers
20th-century American women judges
20th-century American judges
21st-century American judges
21st-century American women judges
African-American judges
Boston University School of Law alumni
Brown University alumni
Judges of the United States Court of Appeals for the First Circuit
People from Anderson, South Carolina
People from Scarsdale, New York
Politicians from Cranston, Rhode Island
Scarsdale High School alumni
United States court of appeals judges appointed by Barack Obama